Siumu is a village on the central south coast of Upolu island in Samoa. The population is 1183. There is also a sub-village Siumu Uta which has a population of 304.

Siumu Electoral Constituency

Siumu Electoral Constituency (Faipule District) comprise the villages of Siumu, Siumu Uta, Maninoa and Saaga. The constituency has a total population of 2,349 and is part of the larger political district Tuamasaga.

Fire dancing
Known for its fire dancers, a 5-year-old girl from the village demonstrating a siva afi (or fire stick dance) was one of the principal performers at the opening ceremony to the 2007 Pacific Games at Apia Park.

References

Populated places in Tuamasaga